Jonas Deumeland (born 9 February 1988) is a German professional footballer who most recently played as a goalkeeper for Start.

Club career
Deumeland started his career with VfL Wolfsburg, but did not become a regular until his three seasons in Belgian outfit K.A.S. Eupen.

Following retirement he made a comeback with SpVgg Greuther Fürth II in 2016–17. In 2018 he was signed by Norwegian club IK Start who was left with only one goalkeeper when first-choice Håkon Opdal was injured. In Deumeland's second match, he too sustained an injury.

Career statistics

Club

References

1988 births
Living people
People from Wolfsburg
German footballers
Association football goalkeepers
Rot-Weiß Oberhausen players
VfL Wolfsburg II players
K.A.S. Eupen players
SpVgg Greuther Fürth II players
IK Start players
Regionalliga players
Challenger Pro League players
Eliteserien players
Norwegian First Division players
German expatriate footballers
Expatriate footballers in Belgium
German expatriate sportspeople in Belgium
Expatriate footballers in Norway
German expatriate sportspeople in Norway
Footballers from Lower Saxony